Mahmud-Ali Maksharipovich Kalimatov (Kokurkhoev) (born on 9 April 1959), is a Russian politician and government official. He was appointed as the acting Head of Ingushetia on 26 June 2019 by the Russian President Vladimir Putin on 26 June 2019 and was elected as the head of the republic on 8 September 2019.

Early life and career

Mahmud-Ali Kalimatov was born in Chemolgan (present day Ushkonyr) on 9 April 1959.

From April 1977 to 1979, he served in the military service of the Soviet Union based in East Germany.

Education 
In 1989, he graduated from the law faculty of the Kuibyshev State University, and worked in the Republic of Komsomol and the Communist Party of the Republic of Kazakhstan of Kuibyshev.

Legislative career 
Since 1990, in the service of the prosecution authorities of the Kuibyshev oblast, he began as an investigator of the district prosecutor's office.

In August 1995, he was appointed deputy prosecutor of the Kirov District of Samara.

Prosecutor of Samara 
In December 1996, he was appointed prosecutor of the Kirov region of Samara.

From 1997 to 2003 he worked as a prosecutor of Samara.

From January 2003 to August 2004 he worked as the first deputy prosecutor of the Samara Oblast.

Prosecutor of Ingushetia 
In August 2004, by order of the Prosecutor General of the Russian Federation, he was appointed prosecutor of the Republic of Ingushetia.

Governor's office in Samara Oblast 
In 2007, he headed the control of the department to the governor of the Samara Oblast.

Since 2012, he worked as an adviser to the governor of the Samara Oblast.

Head of Ingushetia 
On June 26, 2019, Russian President Vladimir Putin appointed Kalimatov as the acting head of the Republic of Ingushetia after the resignation of Yunus-bek Yevkurov. Yevkurov's resignation came about following a long protest movement in the Republic over the 2018 Chechnya–Ingushetia border agreement. The protests began due to the nature of the agreement, with the population of Ingushetia only knowing of the agreement's existence after the deal was signed.

He was awarded the "Honorary Worker of the Prosecutor's Office of the Russian Federation." He was elected as Ingushetia's head by the People's Assembly of the Republic of Ingushetia on September 8, 2019 by receiving votes of 27 deputies of the 31 present, beating his rival candidates Magomed Zurabov and Uruskhan Evloev.

On January 27, 2020, Kalimatov dismissed the government of Ingushetia for unclear reasons, appointing an ethnic Russian, Konstantin Surikov, as the Prime Minister of the Republic.

Family
Kamilatov was married and has two sons. Kalimatov is the brother-in-law of the former head of Ingushetia, Murat Zyazikov, who headed the republic in 2002–2008. They are married to sisters. He had two brothers Alikhan, and Magomed-Bashir. Alikhan (1969-2007), was an employee of the operational investigative department of the Service for the Protection of the Constitutional System and the Fight against Terrorism of the Federal Security Service, a Lt. Colonel. He was posthumously awarded Hero of the Russian Federation, after he died during shelling by unknown persons in 2007. Magomed-Bashir (born 23 February 1958) is currently the director of the Office of the Federal Postal Service of the Russian Federation for the Republic of Ingushetia. Previously, he was the head of the municipality of Ordzhonikidzevskaya.

Awards 

 Honorary employee of the Prosecutor's office of the Russian Federation

References

External links

1959 births
Living people
United Russia politicians
Samara State University alumni